Krzyżewski (feminine: Krzyżewska, plural: Krzyżewscy) is a Polish family name. It is generally derived from Krzyżewo, Podlaskie Voivodeship but may also have origins in Krzyżewo, Braniewo County or Krzyżewo, Ełk County. It may refer to:

 Ewa Krzyżewska (1939–2003), Polish actress
 Mike Krzyzewski (born 1947), American basketball coach at Duke University
 , aristocratic Polish family bearing the Grzymała coat of arms.
  (1923–1988), Polish pedagogue
 , 18th-century Polish soldier
  (1915–1944), Polish poet
  (1938–2003), Polish financial lawyer and economist
  (born 1949), Polish politician
  (born 1953), Polish veterinarian

References

Polish-language surnames